KCTT-FM (101.7 FM) is a radio station licensed to Yellville, Arkansas, United States. The station airs a Classic hits format and is currently owned by Mountain Lakes Broadcasting Corp.

References

External links

CTT-FM
Yellville, Arkansas
Classic hits radio stations in the United States